P. J. Delaney (born 17 March 1984 in Johnstown, County Kilkenny) is an Irish sportsperson. He plays hurling with his local club Fenians and was a member of the Kilkenny senior inter-county team from 2006.

References

1984 births
Living people
Hurling goalkeepers
Fenians hurlers
Kilkenny inter-county hurlers